There are various implementations of the Advanced Encryption Standard, also known as Rijndael.

Libraries 

Rijndael is free for any use public or private, commercial or non-commercial. The authors of Rijndael used to provide a homepage for the algorithm. Care should be taken when implementing AES in software, in particular around side-channel attacks.

The algorithm operates on plaintext blocks of 16 bytes. Encryption of shorter blocks is possible only by padding the source bytes, usually with null bytes. This can be accomplished via several methods, the simplest of which assumes that the final byte of the cipher identifies the number of null bytes of padding added.

Implementation Considerations 
Careful choice must be made in selecting the mode of operation of the cipher. The simplest mode encrypts and decrypts each 128-bit block separately. In this mode, called electronic code book (ECB), blocks that are identical will be encrypted identically; this is entirely insecure. It makes some of the plaintext structure visible in the ciphertext. Selecting other modes, such as using a sequential counter over the block prior to encryption (i.e., CTR mode) and removing it after decryption avoids this problem. Another mode, Cipher Block Chaining (CBC) is one of the most commonly used modes of AES due to its use in TLS. CBC uses a random initialization vector (IV) to ensure that distinct ciphertexts are produced even when the same plaintext is encoded multiple times. The IV can be transmitted in the clear without jeopardizing security. A common practice is to prepend the 16 byte IV to the ciphertext, which gives the decrypter easy access to the IV. Care must be taken to use a new IV for every encryption operation, since otherwise an attacker can recover plaintext.  

 Current list of FIPS 197 validated cryptographic modules (hosted by NIST)
 Current list of FIPS 140 validated cryptographic modules with validated AES implementations (hosted by NIST) – Most of these involve a commercial implementation of AES algorithms. Look for "FIPS-approved algorithms" entry in the "Level / Description" column followed by "AES" and then a specific certificate number.

C/ASM library 
 Libgcrypt
 wolfSSL (previously CyaSSL)
 GnuTLS
 Network Security Services
 OpenSSL
 LibreSSL
 mbed TLS (previously PolarSSL)
 Reference original implementation
 axTLS
 Microsoft CryptoAPI uses Cryptographic Service Providers to offer encryption implementations. The Microsoft AES Cryptographic Provider was introduced in Windows XP and can be used with any version of the Microsoft CryptoAPI.
 tiny-AES-c Small portable AES128/192/256 in C (suitable for embedded systems)
 AES-256 A byte-oriented portable AES-256 implementation in C
 Solaris Cryptographic Framework offers multiple implementations, with kernel providers for hardware acceleration on x86 (using the Intel AES instruction set) and on SPARC (using the SPARC AES instruction set). It is available in Solaris and derivatives, as of Solaris 10.
 OpenAES portable C cryptographic library
 LibTomCrypt is a modular and portable cryptographic toolkit that provides developers with well known published block ciphers, one-way hash functions, chaining modes, pseudo-random number generators, public key cryptography and other routines.
 libSodium API for NaCl
AES Dust Compact implementation of AES-128 encryption in C, x86, AMD64, ARM32 and ARM64 assembly.
 MSP430 AES Implementation for embedded 16-bit microcontroller
 Gladman AES AES code with optional support for Intel AES NI and VIA ACE by Dr. Brian Gladman.

C++ library 
 Botan has implemented Rijndael since its very first release in 2001
 Crypto++ A comprehensive C++ public-domain implementation of encryption and hash algorithms. FIPS validated

C/CUDA library 
 gKrypt has implemented Rijndael on CUDA with its first release in 2012

C# /.NET 
 As of version 3.5 of the .NET Framework, the System.Security.Cryptography namespace contains both a fully managed implementation of AES and a managed wrapper around the CAPI AES implementation.
 Bouncy Castle Crypto Library

Delphi 
 Delphi Encryption Compendium  has a cross platofrom capable AES implementation, among implementations of various other cryptograhphic algorithms

Go 
 The crypto/aes package in standard library

Java 
 Java Cryptography Extension, integrated in the Java Runtime Environment since version 1.4.2
 IAIK JCE
 Bouncy Castle Crypto Library

Python 
 PyCrypto – The Python Cryptography Toolkit PyCrypto, extended in PyCryptoDome
 keyczar – Cryptography Toolkit keyczar
 M2Crypto – M2Crypto is the most complete OpenSSL wrapper for Python.
 Cryptography – Python library which exposes cryptographic recipes and primitives.
 PyNaCl – Python binding for libSodium (NaCl)

JavaScript 

 SJCL library – contains JavaScript implementations of AES in CCM, CBC, OCB and GCM modes
 AES-JS – portable JavaScript implementation of AES ECB and CTR modes
 Forge – JavaScript implementations of AES in CBC, CTR, OFB, CFB, and GCM modes
 asmCrypto – JavaScript implementation of popular cryptographic utilities with focus on performance. Supports CBC, CFB, CCM modes.
 pidCrypt – open source JavaScript library. Only supports the CBC and CTR modes.

Rust 
 aes – Rust implementation.

LabVIEW 
 AES LabVIEW – LabVIEW implementation.

Applications

Archive and compression tools 
7z
Amanda Backup
B1
PeaZip
PKZIP
RAR
UltraISO
WinZip

File encryption 
 Away RJN Cryptography  uses Rijndael Algorithm (NIST AES) 256-bit Data Blocks, Cipher Key and CTR (Counter Mode) for any and all Document or picture encryption in Windows only.   
Gpg4win
Ncrypt

Encrypting file systems 
Most encrypting file systems use AES, e.g. NTFS

Disk / partition encryption 
 BitLocker (part of certain editions of Windows operating systems)
 CipherShed
 DiskCryptor
 FileVault (part of the Mac OS X operating system, and also the included Disk Utility makes AES-encrypted drive images)
 GBDE
 Geli (software)
 LibreCrypt (discontinued)
 LUKS
 Private Disk
 TrueCrypt (discontinued)
 VeraCrypt

Storage encryption 
 Bloombase StoreSafe
 Brocade Encryption Switch
 IBM Encryption Blade
 Vormetric Transparent Encryption (VTE)

Security for communications in local area networks 
 IEEE 802.11i, an amendment to the original IEEE 802.11 standard specifying security mechanisms for wireless networks, uses AES-128 in CCM mode (CCMP).
 The ITU-T G.hn standard, which provides a way to create a high-speed (up to 1 Gigabit/s) local area network using existing home wiring (power lines, phone lines and coaxial cables), uses AES-128 for encryption.

Miscellaneous 
 DataLocker Uses AES 256-bit CBC and XTS mode hardware encryption
 Get Backup Pro uses AES-128 and AES-256
 GPG, GPL-licensed, includes AES, AES-192, and AES-256 as options.
 IPsec
 IronKey Uses AES 128-bit and 256-bit CBC-mode hardware encryption
 KeePass Password Safe
 LastPass
 Linux kernel's Crypto API, now exposed to userspace
 NetLib Encryptionizer supports AES 128/256 in CBC, ECB and CTR modes for file and folder encryption on the Windows platform.
 Pidgin (software), has a plugin that allows for AES Encryption
 Javascrypt Free open-source text encryption tool runs entirely in web browser, send encrypted text over insecure e-mail or fax machine.
 PyEyeCrypt Free open-source text encryption tool/GUI with user-selectable AES encryption methods and PBKDF2 iterations.
 Signal Protocol
 Google Allo (optional)
 Facebook Messenger (optional)
 Signal
 TextSecure
 WhatsApp
 SocialDocs file encryption uses AES256 to provide a free-online file encryption tool
 XFire uses AES-128, AES-192 and AES 256 to encrypt usernames and passwords
 Certain games and engines, such as the Rockstar Advanced Game Engine used in Grand Theft Auto IV, use AES to encrypt game assets in order to deter hacking in multiplayer.

Hardware 
 x86-64 and ARM processors include the AES instruction set.
 On IBM zSeries mainframes, AES is implemented as the KM series of assembler opcodes when various Message Security Assist facilities are installed.
 SPARC S3 core processors include the AES instruction set, which is used with SPARC T4 and SPARC T5 systems.

References

Advanced Encryption Standard